Theodore Gaillard Hunt (October 23, 1805 – November 15, 1893) was an American lawyer and politician who served as a member of the U. S. House of Representatives representing the state of Louisiana. From 1853 to 1855, he served one term as a Whig. 

In 1854, he ran for re-election and lost as a candidate of the American (Know-Nothing) Party.

Biography
Hunt was born in Charleston, South Carolina.  In addition to being a member of Congress, Hunt was district attorney for New Orleans, member of the state House of Representative for sixteen years, and later a judge. During his tenure in congress he is notable as one of the few Southerners to have opposed the Kansas-Nebraska Act.

Civil War 
During the American Civil War, Hunt was the colonel of the rebel 5th Louisiana Infantry in 1861-62 and later a brigadier general in the Louisiana militia. After New Orleans fell into Union hands, Hunt, who had opposed secession, resigned from the Confederate Army and became Adjutant General of Union Louisiana.

Death 
He died onNovember 15, 1893 at the age of 88.

References

External links

Theodore Gaillard Hunt entry at The Political Graveyard

1805 births
1893 deaths
Politicians from Charleston, South Carolina
Lawyers from Charleston, South Carolina
American people of English descent
Whig Party members of the United States House of Representatives from Louisiana
Louisiana Know Nothings
Members of the Louisiana House of Representatives
Confederate States Army officers
Louisiana Tigers
People of Louisiana in the American Civil War
People of South Carolina in the American Civil War
Columbia Law School alumni
19th-century American lawyers
Confederate militia generals